The German Athletics Association (German: Deutscher Leichtathletik-Verband, DLV) is the governing body for the sport of athletics in Germany.

Since 2010, Germany's kits are supplied by Nike.

See also
German Athletics Championships
East Germany national athletics team

External links 
  
 Leichtathletik-Datenbank for athletes statistics (in German)

Germany
Athletics in Germany
Athletics
Sports organizations established in 1898
National governing bodies for athletics